Rosemary Sorensen (born 1954) is an Australian journalist, editor, and literary critic previously working for The Australian, then for the Bendigo Weekly. Sorensen was formerly an editor of the Australian Book Review, and the books and arts editor for the Brisbane Courier-Mail. In 2012, together with staff of the City of Greater Bendigo, she assisted in the creation of the Bendigo Writers Festival and is currently employed as its festival director.

References

External links
 Scripsi archives, University of Melbourne

Living people
1954 births
Place of birth missing (living people)
Australian journalists
Australian women journalists
Australian women literary critics
Australian literary critics